Mahyar Sedaghat (born 18 April 1996) is an Iranian sport shooter, born in Tehran. He represented Iran at the 2020 Summer Olympics in Tokyo 2021, competing in Men's 10 metre air rifle, Men's 50 metre rifle three positions and in Mixed 10 metre air rifle team.

References

External links 
 Mahyar Sedaghat at ISSF
 

 

1996 births
Living people
Sportspeople from Tehran
Iranian male sport shooters
Shooters at the 2020 Summer Olympics
Olympic shooters of Iran
Shooters at the 2018 Asian Games
Universiade medalists in shooting
Universiade gold medalists for Iran
Universiade silver medalists for Iran
Medalists at the 2019 Summer Universiade
21st-century Iranian people